Christian Manon (born 5 January 1950) is a French-Australian actor based in Sydney, best known for his work in theatre. His most notable film role was Mael in the film adaptation of the Anne Rice novel, Queen of the Damned.

Credits
Manon is the grandson of turn-of-the-century French opera singer Max-Duiram (1876-1945). His most influential tutor was the celebrated Czech national treasure  Zora Semberova.
Following a two years residency as actor/writer with innovative multicultural Sidetrack Theatre, Manon has worked in five stage productions with the Sydney Theatre Company as well as with the Bell Shakespeare Company, Belvoir and the Australian Nouveau Theatre (ANTHILL). He toured Australia and New-Zealand for John Frost in Noël Coward's Fallen Angels with Hayley Mills and Juliet Mills. He has worked several times with Australian directors Barrie Kosky and Jean-Pierre Mignon.

A long string of television appearances began in 1982 with Bodyline and most notably includes A Country Practice, A Difficult Woman, Bondi Banquet, BackBerner, All Saints, Stupid Stupid Man, An Accidental Soldier, Packed to the Rafters, A Place to Call Home,  Australia: The Story of Us, True Story with Hamish & Andy, Doctor Doctor.

Notable short films include John Curran's iconic Down Rusty Down as well as Fallers, Gödel Incomplete, A Farewell Party amongst many others.

His feature film credits include Young Einstein, The Punisher, Oscar and Lucinda, Babe: Pig in the City, Mission: Impossible 2 and Queen of the Damned.

You might have seen him in several advertising films, most memorable being for Powerball lottery, Herringbone clothing, Yen Magazine, Lipton tea, Enjo gloves, Sensodine tooth paste and many more.

Manon has also lent his voice to many ABC Radio and Radio National's programs.

Filmography

References

https://trove.nla.gov.au/people/1562146?c=people

External links

Official website
Sydney Morning Herald article
SMH review of The miser
TV picks, Tuesday: True Story with Hamish & Andy, The House with Annabel Crabb

French male film actors
French male stage actors
French male television actors
Australian male film actors
Australian male stage actors
Australian male television actors
Living people
1950 births